In 2001, the Institute of Archaeology of the Chinese Academy of Social Sciences organized a poll for China's 100 major archaeological discoveries in the 20th century. The participants included eight national-level institutions for archaeology and cultural relics, provincial-level archaeological institutes from 28 provinces, municipalities, and autonomous regions, as well as from Hong Kong, the archaeological departments of 11 major national universities, and many other scholars in Beijing. After three months and three rounds of voting, the results were announced on 29 March 2001 and were published in the journal Kaogu (Archaeology). In 2002, the Chinese Academy of Social Sciences Press published the book China's 100 Major Archaeological Discoveries in the 20th Century (二十世纪中国百项考古大发现), with more than 500 pages and 1,512 pictures.

Among all the candidates, the late-Shang dynasty capital Yinxu received the highest number of votes. Other sites that received high votes include Zhoukoudian, Banpo, Erlitou, Sanxingdui, Mausoleum of the First Qin Emperor and the Terracotta Army, Han dynasty Chang'an, Juyan Han ruins, the Yungang Grottoes, the Longmen Grottoes, the Dunhuang Grottoes, Luoyang of Sui–Tang dynasties, and the Dingling mausoleum.

Of the 100 discoveries selected, 51% were made by scientific initiative, whereas 31% were made accidentally and 10% were rescue archaeology. More than half of the academic discoveries were made in the Yellow River region, reflecting the traditional view, held by most archaeologists until the 1980s, that the Chinese civilization originated there. By contrast, other regions such as the Yangtze River valley accounted for two thirds of the accidental discoveries, typically found during construction.

List by chronology
The 100 major archaeological discoveries selected include 7 discoveries from the Palaeolithic Age, 30 from the Neolithic Age, 23 from the Xia–Shang–Zhou era, 24 from the Qin and Han to the Northern and Southern dynasties, and 16 from the Sui–Tang and later dynasties. The list below is ordered chronologically, from the oldest to the most recent.

Palaeolithic Age

1. Zhoukoudian, the Peking Man, and the Upper Cave Man in Beijing
2. Yuanmou Man in Yunnan
3. Lantian Man in Shaanxi
4. Jinniushan and the Jinniushan Man in Yingkou, Liaoning
5. Maba Man, Qujiang, Guangdong
6. Nihewan site cluster in Yangyuan, Hebei
7. Dingcun in Xiangfen, Shanxi

Neolithic Age

8. Xianren Cave and Diaotonghuan in Wannian, Jiangxi
9. Yuchanyan in Dao County, Hunan
10. Peiligang in Xinzheng, Henan
11. Jiahu in Wuyang County, Henan
12. Dadiwan in Qin'an, Gansu
13. Chengtoushan in Li County, Hunan
14. Xinglongwa in Chifeng, Liaoning
15. Yangshao in Mianchi, Henan
16. Banpo in Xi'an, Shaanxi
17. Jiangzhai in Lintong, Shaanxi
18. Hemudu in Yuyao, Zhejiang
19. Dawenkou in Tai'an, Shandong
20. Daxi in Wushan County, Chongqing
21. Qujialing in Jingshan County, Hubei
22. Hougang in Anyang, Henan
23. Miaodigou in Shanzhou, Henan
24. Wangchenggang Longshan culture site in Dengfeng, Henan
25. Songze in Shanghai
26. Chengziya Longshan culture site in Zhangqiu, Shandong
27. Liangzhu culture sites in Yuhang, Zhejiang
28. Shijiahe culture sites in Tianmen, Hubei
29. Majiayao culture sites in Lintao, Gansu
30. Liuwan cemeteries (Neolithic to Bronze Age) in Ledu, Qinghai
31. Hongshan culture sites in Lingyuan and Jianping County, Liaoning
32. Karuo culture sites in Chamdo, Tibet
33. Shixia culture sites in Qujiang, Guangdong
34. Taosi Longshan culture site in Xiangfen, Shanxi
35. Tung Wan Tsai North in Ma Wan, Hong Kong
36. Yuanshan in Taipei, Taiwan

Xia, Shang, and Zhou

37. Qijiaping Qijia culture site in Guanghe County, Gansu
38. Erlitou site in Yanshi, Henan
39. Dongxiafeng Erlitou culture site in Xia County, Shanxi
40. Xiajiadian early Bronze Age site in Chifeng, Inner Mongolia
41. Dadianzi Lower Xiajiadian culture site in Aohan Banner, Inner Mongolia
42. Yanshi Shang City in Yanshi, Henan
43. Zhengzhou Shang City in Zhengzhou, Henan
44. Panlongcheng, Shang dynasty city in Huangpi, Hubei
45. Yinxu, late-Shang dynasty capital in Anyang, Henan
46. Wucheng culture site in Zhangshu, Jiangxi
47. Xingan late-Shang tomb in Xingan, Jiangxi
48. Sanxingdui in Guanghan, Sichuan
49. Zhouyuan Western Zhou site in Shaanxi
50. Fenghao, capital of Western Zhou in Shaanxi
51. Liulihe site, Yan state capital and cemetery in Beijing
52. Jin state cemetery in Quwo, Shanxi
53. Shangyang city, capital of Guo and cemetery in Sanmenxia, Henan
54. Jin state capital in Houma, Shanxi
55. Zheng–Han City in Xinzheng, Henan
56. Lower Capital of Yan in Yi County, Hebei
57. Tomb of Marquis Yi of Zeng, Sui County, Hubei
58. Jinancheng, capital of Chu in Jiangling County, Hubei
59. Tomb of King Cuo of Zhongshan in Pingshan County, Hebei
60. Tonglüshan mining site, Hubei

Qin, Han, Wei, Jin, and Northern and Southern Dynasties

61. Qin capital Xianyang and palaces, Shaanxi
62. Mausoleum of the First Qin Emperor and the Terracotta Army, Lintong, Shaanxi
63. Shuihudi and Longgang Qin tombs, Yunmeng, Hubei
64. Chang'an of Han dynasty, Xi'an, Shaanxi
65. Western Han imperial mausoleums, Shaanxi
66. Mancheng Han tombs, Hebei
67. Mausoleums of Han dynasty Kings of Chu, Xuzhou, Jiangsu
68. Mawangdui Han tombs, Hunan
69. Mausoleum of the Nanyue King, Guangzhou, Guangdong
70. Yinqueshan Han tombs, Linyi, Shandong
71. Shaogou Han tombs, Luoyang, Henan
72. Shizhaishan cemetery for the kings and nobles of Dian, Jinning, Yunnan
73. Juyan Han ruins and slips, Inner Mongolia
74. Han–Wei Luoyang, Luoyang, Henan
75. Capital of the Loulan Kingdom, Xinjiang
76. Niya in Minfeng County, Xinjiang
77. Yecheng, Linzhang, Hebei
78. Zoumalou bamboo slips, Changsha, Hunan
79. Southern dynasties tombs in Nanjing, Jiangsu
80. Yungang Grottoes, Datong, Shanxi
81. Longmen Grottoes, Luoyang, Henan
82. Koguryo tombs in Ji'an, Jilin
83. Mogao Caves, Dunhuang, Gansu
84. Longxing Temple hoard of Buddhist statues, Qingzhou, Shandong

Sui, Tang, and later dynasties

85. Daxing–Chang'an City, capital of the Sui and Tang dynasties, Xi'an, Shaanxi
86. Sui–Tang Luoyang and Song dynasty government sites, Luoyang, Henan
87. Yu Hong tomb of the Sui dynasty, Taiyuan, Shanxi
88. Subsidiary tombs of Tang dynasty imperial mausoleums, Shaanxi
89. Famen Temple pagoda base, Fufeng, Shaanxi
90. Astana Cemetery and documents, Turpan, Xinjiang
91. Shangjing Longquanfu, Ning'an, Heilongjiang
92. Two imperial mausoleums of the Southern Tang dynasty, Nanjing, Jiangsu
93. Tomb of the Liao dynasty Princess of Chen, Naiman Banner, Inner Mongolia
94. Baisha Song tombs, Yu County, Henan
95. Western Xia mausoleums, Yinchuan, Ningxia
96. Longquan Kiln of the Southern Song dynasty, Zhejiang
97. Yaozhou Kiln, Tongchuan, Shaanxi
98. Capital of the Guge Kingdom, Tibet
99. Dadu, capital of the Yuan dynasty, Beijing
100. Dingling mausoleum, Beijing

See also
National archaeological park of China

References

20th-century archaeological discoveries
Archaeological sites in China
20th century in China
2001 in China